Wellenreiter is the largest yacht ever to be launched by Jongert. The ship was designed by André  Hoek and built in 2003.

Specifications
Length overall: 
Load Waterline Length 
Beam: 
Draught (minimum): 
Draught (maximum): 
Rig: sloop
Naval architecture: André  Hoek
Interior decoration: Jongert
Hull material: steel
Superstructure material: aluminium
Spars: aluminium
Main sail: 
Genoa: 
Staysail: 
General Arrangement: www.jongert.nl

See also
 Sailing yacht
 List of large sailing yachts
 List of yachts built by Jongert

References
Jongert shipyard
Hoek Design

2003 ships
Ships built in the Netherlands
Sailing yachts